Arthur L. Jenkins III is an American fellowship-trained neurosurgeon, co-director of the Neurosurgical Spine Program, and Director of Spinal Oncology and Minimally Invasive Spinal Surgery (MIS) Program at the Mount Sinai Hospital, New York. Additionally, he is an associate professor of Neurosurgery and of Orthopedic Surgery at the Mount Sinai School of Medicine. Dr. Jenkins has multiple patents and patent applications for spine-related implants and support systems, and is developing new minimally invasive treatments for patients with cancer that has spread to the spine. He is an innovator in the treatment of acute spinal cord injury as well as degenerative and congenital anomalies of the spine, taking a minimally invasive or minimal-impact approach where possible. He is board certified in Neurological Surgery and is licensed in New York and Connecticut.

Biography
Jenkins received his B.A. in chemistry at the University of Pennsylvania in 1989 and his M.D. at the University of Pennsylvania School of Medicine in 1993. He interned in surgery at the New York University Medical Center from 1993-1994, was in residence at the Department of Neurosurgery at the Mount Sinai Medical Center from 1994-2000 and was fellow under Dr. Eric Woodard in Complex Spinal Surgery, at the Brigham and Women's Hospital in Boston, Massachusetts from 2000-2001. Jenkins' present professional appointments include medical advisory board member of the Alan T. Brown Spinal Cord Injury Foundation and neurosurgical consultant for players with spinal disorders for the National Football League's Retired Player Program  as well as the New York Jets professional football team. In 2001, Jenkins was named an Honorary Police Surgeon of the New York City Police Department.  He left the full-time faculty (keeping a voluntary faculty appointment as Associate Clinical Professor in the Departments of Neurosurgery and Orthopedic Surgery) in January 2018 to found his new practice, Jenkins NeuroSpine.  He continues his research, and clinical activities with the NY Jets, the NYPD, and the Retired Players Program of the NFL.

Neurotect, LLC.
He started a company, called Neurotect LLC  to develop the technology for prevention of spinal or orthopedic injuries, or to facilitate the extraction of accident victims trapped in a vehicle. This company is working with his team and other collaborators to bring these safety devices to the market, with an eye on reducing the need for, or severity of, neurosurgical treatment for these accident victims.

Academic Research
Dr. Jenkins conducts his research at the Icahn School of Medicine  and it is related to neurosurgery and spinal surgery. His clinical research focuses on developing new techniques to treat various conditions, managing post-operative pain, developing or advancing procedures that preserve motion, and stem cell injections for spinal cord injuries. His scientific research focuses on treatments for spinal cord injury-acute and delayed intervention. This includes surgical techniques to restore function lost below the level of injury. His current research includes minimally invasive surgery for metastatic disease to the spinal bones, assessment of mobility recovery after spinal surgery using wireless technology, a prospective study for minimally invasive surgery for spine metastases, spine surgery outcomes research, mindfulness meditation for spine surgery pain, and InVivo’s clinical study of its investigational Neuro-Spinal Scaffold in patients with acute spinal cord injury. He has published and presented nationally and internationally on the subjects of spinal cord injury, spinal tumors, and minimally invasive spinal surgery as well as on general spinal surgical outcomes.  He is a member of multiple research groups, but is known for his work in three main areas in addition to general outcomes research:

Spinal Tumors:
Dr. Jenkins pioneered a new and minimally invasive way of performing spinal tumor surgery  one that reduces the risks and increases the benefits when compared to open standard surgical treatments for tumors of the spine.  Dr. Jenkins developed, with the Radiation Oncologist Dr. Jamie Cesaretti, an implantable device to protect the spinal cord from damage from radiation therapy given to patients with spinal tumors.  This device would allow for higher doses of radiation to the tumor while protecting the spinal cord.

Spinal Cord Injury:
Dr. Jenkins is the director of the Mount Sinai Neurosurgery Spinal Cord Injury Laboratory, and in that capacity is also collaborating with Dr. Avraham Dilmanian  of the Brookhaven National Laboratory and Stonybrook University in developing novel treatments for spinal cord injury(ref Dilmanian articles).  Dr. Jenkins is currently the Principal Investigator at Mount Sinai for the InVivo clinical trial for Complete Traumatic Acute Spinal Cord Injury  as well as the principal surgeon for the StemCellsInc clinical trial for Stem Cell Transplantation in Cervical Spinal Cord Injury.  He was honored by the Alan T. Brown Foundation in 2015 for his clinical and research work on spinal cord injured patients.
Mindfulness Meditation:
Dr. Jenkins, in conjunction with Dr. Patricia Bloom, has developed a program to test the hypothesis that Mindfulness Meditation can reduce the need for post-operative pain medications after spinal surgery procedures.

He is on the Board of Directors of the Orthopedic Foundation for Active Lifestyles.

In the News
Dr. Jenkins discusses spinal tumors in The Daily News feature The Daily Check Up 
Dr. Arthur Jenkins Comments On the Brain Injury of Gabrielle Gifford
Dr. Jenkins discusses how more people suffer from paralysis than thought with ABC News.
Dr. Jenkins talks minimally invasive surgical techniques 
Dr. Jenkins completes surgery on Islanders center Kevin Colley – First Of Two Stages Of Surgery Completed 
Dr. Arthur Jenkins comments on Tulane University football player Devon Walker's injury 
Dr. Jenkins presents on Minimally invasive resections of metastatic tumors at the 5th International Neurosurgical Winter Congress in 2013 
Arthur L. Jenkins III, MD, Spearheads Major Advances in Spine Tumor Treatment 
Dr. Jenkins is 1 of 20 Spine Surgeon Leaders of Spinal Oncology Programs

Honors and awards
2015 Alan T Brown Standing Tall Award 
2014 - 2019 America's Top Doctors; Castle Connolly 
2014 - 2019 New York Metro Top Doctors;  Castle Connolly 
2014 - 2019 Top Doctors for Cancer; Castle Connolly 
2014 - 2019 Top Doctor New York Magazine
2015 - 2019 New York Super Doctors
2014 - Top 10 Doctor, New York State Vitals.com
2010-2019 Top Doctor Vitals.com
2010-2019 Most Compassionate Doctor Vitals.com
Honorary Police Surgeon, New York Police Department, December 31, 2001 
Professional of the Year 2006, "Spinal Neurosurgery"

Patents
 "Implanted Spinal Radiation Shield", Provisional Patent filed April 10, 2009, international PCT patent application filed, publication date Feb 16, 2012
 US 8,551,030(Ref USPTO.gov) "Dynamically Reactive Flexible and Rigid Spinal Support System", Provisional Patent filed November 3, 2009, International PCT patent application filed November 2, 2010.
US 8,708,940(Ref USPTO.gov) "Dynamically Reactive Spinal Support System", 4/29/2014, international PCT patent application filed 
US 9,072,822(ref USPTO)  "Spinal Shield Implant and Treatment of Spinal Metastases", Jul 7, 2015; International PCT patent application filed, publication date Feb 16, 2012
"Multilayered electromagnetic assembly", patent pending, USPTO patent filed Dec 13, 2013, International PCT patent application filed, publication date Jun 19, 2014

Notable publications

Society Memberships 
American Association of Neurological Surgeons 
Congress of Neurological Surgeons 
North American Spine Society 
The European Association of Neurosurgical Societies 
Society for Minimally Invasive Spine Surgery

References

External links
 
 Personal website

Living people
Icahn School of Medicine at Mount Sinai faculty
American neurosurgeons
Perelman School of Medicine at the University of Pennsylvania alumni
Year of birth missing (living people)